The Cairoli II government of Italy held office from 14 July 1879 until 25 November 1879, a total of 134 days, or 4 months and 11 days.

Government parties
The government was composed by the following parties:

Composition

References

Italian governments
1879 establishments in Italy